Pork Recordings is a record label based in Kingston upon Hull, East Yorkshire, England, that specialises in electronica, mostly in the downtempo or chill-out styles.

Formed in the early 1990s by David "Porky" Brennand and Steve Cobby, its most significant artists included Fila Brazillia, Baby Mammoth, Bullitnuts and most recently Leggo Beast.

Brennand also records with Steel Tiger Records as The Cutler; a collaboration with Steve Cobby.

See also
 List of record labels
 List of electronic music record labels

References

 Drum 'n' Bass: The Rough Guide – Peter Shapiro – Google Books
 All Music Guide to Electronica: The Definitive Guide to Electronic Music – Vladimir Bogdanov – Google Books

External links
 Pork Recordings discography

British record labels
Record labels established in 1994
Electronic music record labels